Philomycus togatus, also known as the toga mantleslug, is a species of land slug, a terrestrial pulmonate gastropod mollusk in the family Philomycidae.

Anatomy
These slugs create and use love darts as part of their mating behavior.

References

Philomycidae